St. George's-by-the-River Episcopal Church is a historic church at 7 Lincoln Avenue in Rumson, Monmouth County, New Jersey, United States.

It was built in 1907 and added to the National Register in 2007.

The tower contains a carillon of 26 bells, cast by John Taylor & Co in 1934 and 2001.

Notable clergy
John Andrew; curate from 1959–1960, later Rector of Saint Thomas Church, New York
G. P. Mellick Belshaw; rector from 1963–1973, later ninth Bishop of the Episcopal Diocese of New Jersey.

References

Churches completed in 1907
20th-century Episcopal church buildings
Episcopal church buildings in New Jersey
Churches on the National Register of Historic Places in New Jersey
Gothic Revival church buildings in New Jersey
Churches in Monmouth County, New Jersey
Rumson, New Jersey
National Register of Historic Places in Monmouth County, New Jersey
New Jersey Register of Historic Places
Carillons